Amy Millan (born December 3, 1973) is a Canadian indie rock singer and guitarist. She records and performs with the bands Stars and Broken Social Scene as well as having a successful solo career. Her second solo album, Masters of the Burial, was released by Arts & Crafts Productions in September 2009.

Biography

Early life 

Amy Millan grew up in the Cabbagetown neighbourhood of Toronto. She attended high school at Jarvis Collegiate Institute, and later the Etobicoke School of the Arts where she studied drama alongside future Broken Social Scene bandmates Kevin Drew and Emily Haines. Millan and Haines formed the band Edith's Mission. Although short-lived, Edith's Mission did play a sold-out show at the Horseshoe Tavern in Toronto. After high school, Millan moved to Montreal for three years to attend Concordia University and gained experience as a solo performer by playing in coffee shops. Upon returning to Toronto, she formed the roots-rock band 16 Tons and wrote many of the songs that she would use to launch her solo career several years later.  After the breakup of 16 Tons, Millan moved to Los Angeles. While living there, her song with 16 Tons, "Bury Me," was added to the soundtrack of the film Drowning Mona. However, Millan, missing a city where walking was encouraged over driving, returned to Toronto.

Stars 

Stars was formed by Torquil Campbell and Chris Seligman in New York City. The line-up subsequently grew to incorporate Evan Cranley, with whom Millan had played gigs while a member of 16 Tons. Feeling that Millan would be a good fit for the group, Cranley invited her to New York City to audition in December 1999. After receiving assurances that she would be actively involved in the songwriting process, Millan agreed to join the band. As much of their debut album had been recorded prior to her joining, Millan's involvement in 2001's Nightsongs was limited, although she did sing lead vocals on "Toxic Holiday". Desiring to return to Canada, but not wanting to move to Toronto, the band relocated to Montreal. Drummer Pat McGee was recruited as their fifth member prior to the release of their second album, Heart, in 2003. Millan's influence was more evident on this album, and a number of the tracks were performed as duets between her and Torquil Campbell, establishing a style for which the band would become well known. Stars' commercial breakthrough came with their 2004 album Set Yourself on Fire and the accompanying single "Ageless Beauty", which featured a lead vocal by Millan. Their fourth album, In Our Bedroom After the War, was released in 2007 and was followed by the EP Sad Robots the following year. In June 2010, they released their fifth full-length album, The Five Ghosts.

Broken Social Scene
Although she did not officially contribute to Broken Social Scene's first two albums, due to scheduling conflicts for BSS members Emily Haines and Leslie Feist, she was asked by former classmate Kevin Drew to "be the girl" and sing with the band for the release concert of the band's second album, You Forgot It in People. From 2002 onward, Millan has often performed in BSS alongside fellow Stars members Evan Cranley, Chris Seligman and Torquil Campbell.  She appeared on their 2005 self-titled album and also contributed vocals and writing to Kevin Drew's 2007 solo album Spirit If... as well as to Brendan Canning's 2008 solo album Something For All of Us. As in Stars, Amy usually sings with BSS but also plays guitar and percussion during live shows.

Honey from the Tombs 

Amy Millan released her debut solo album, Honey from the Tombs, in 2006. It consisted of songs largely written before 2000, from when Millan was a member of 16 Tons. The album title was inspired by a Tom Waits interview where he compared the release of older songs to the discovery of sweet honey buried in Egyptian tombs. The album was produced by Ian Blurton and musical contributors included Brendan Canning and Kevin Drew of Broken Social Scene and Dan and Jenny Whiteley from Crazy Strings.

In contrast to her work with Stars, Millan's solo work is strongly influenced by country and folk music. Thematically, many of the songs deal with loss and loneliness, and taking solace in alcohol is sung about numerous times. Millan's upbringing in Toronto provided the inspiration for the song "Wayward and Parliament", which is based on her time working in the coffee shop "Jet Fuel" on Parliament Street.

Two videos were shot to promote Honey from the Tombs: "Skinny Boy" was directed by George Vale, and "Baby I" was directed by Anthony Seck. The songs "Losin' You" and "Baby I", were released as 7" singles in Europe. Millan also toured extensively to support the album, playing dates in North America, Japan and Europe.

Masters of the Burial 

Millan released her second album, Masters of the Burial, on September 8, 2009. The album is produced by Martin Kinack and musicians appearing include Evan Cranley, Dan and Jenny Whiteley, Leslie Feist and Liam O'Neil. The album features several cover songs, including some written by Death Cab for Cutie and Sarah Harmer.

Personal life

Millan is married to Stars bandmate Evan Cranley. Their daughter, Delphine Rita Jane Cranley, was born on March 21, 2011. Millan gave birth to a son in 2017.

Discography

Albums

EPs

Singles

Compilations

Collaborations 

For Amy Millan's work with Stars, see Stars discography.

Footnotes

External links 
 Amy Millan official website
 2009 Amy Millan Interview at Bandega.com

1973 births
Living people
Canadian pop guitarists
Canadian women guitarists
Canadian indie pop musicians
Canadian indie rock musicians
Canadian women rock singers
Musicians from Toronto
Arts & Crafts Productions artists
Stars (Canadian band) members
Broken Social Scene members
Canadian women pop singers
20th-century Canadian guitarists
21st-century Canadian guitarists
20th-century Canadian pianists
21st-century Canadian pianists
Canadian rock pianists
Canadian women pianists
20th-century Canadian women singers
21st-century Canadian women singers
20th-century women guitarists
21st-century women guitarists
20th-century women pianists
21st-century women pianists